"Nothing's Gonna Stop Me Now" is a song performed by British singer Samantha Fox and written and produced by Mike Stock, Matt Aitken, and Pete Waterman (SAW). It was released as the first single from Samantha’s eponymous second album, Samantha Fox, in the spring of 1987.

The track was recorded after Fox's label heavily lobbied SAW to record with the singer, who the trio had previously vowed nor to work with due to her topless modelling past. The producers agreed to record with Fox after being impressed with her during an initial meeting, with Stock then writing lyrics inspired by Fox's comments to him about wanting to break free of her manager father. Stock wrote most of the lyrics with Fox sitting beside him at the console, a process interrupted for a few hours when she spilt a cup of tea onto the mixing desk.

Fox and her manager father insisted on the inclusion of a guitar solo, which was added - but the sound was simulated with a synthesiser. Fox never knew the guitar was simulated until 2022, expressing her shock at the revelation.

The single became Samantha's third and final top ten single in the United Kingdom, peaking at #8 in June. In the United States, the single was released in the fall of 1987 and reached only #80 that October. It was a Top 10 hit in Continental Europe. It also reached #22 in Australia.

In 2010 the song was covered by German television celebrity Daniela Katzenberger.

Music video
The accompanying music video for the song was filmed in Marbella, Spain. Samantha Fox is shown using several forms of locomotion including a Sunseeker XPS 34 motorboat, a horse, an Alfa Romeo Spider, a Cessna Skymaster, and a BMX bike. She is also shown beside (and in) an outdoor swimming pool, wearing a "zebra-print" one-piece bathing suit with high-heeled shoes. Fox had never ridden a horse before the shoot and had only just qualified for her driver's license, having never driven a manual car before, despite the video requiring her to drive on steep mountain roads.

Critical reception
In ironic review of 23 May 1987 for Number One John Aizlewood said that this song is completely similar to "other hits" of the singer and proposed to change profession to bar maid.

Impact and legacy
British magazine Classic Pop ranked the song number 40 in their list of 'Top 40 Stock Aitken Waterman songs' in 2021. They wrote, "Page 3 girl Samantha Fox, the pin-up on many a pre-pubescent teen’s bedroom wall, was hardly the pop sophisticate, but SAW gave her an exceptionally big hit with this inspiriting UK No.8."

Formats and track listings
 7" Single
"Nothing's Gonna Stop Me Now" - 3:42
"Dream City" - 4:55
 UK / EU 12" Single
"Nothing's Gonna Stop Me Now" (Extended Version) - 7:01
"Dream City" - 4:55
"Want You to Want Me" - 3:31
 US 12" Single
"Nothing's Gonna Stop Me Now" (Extended Version) - 7:01
"Nothing's Gonna Stop Me Now" - 3:42
"Nothing's Gonna Stop Me Now" (Cub Mix) - 6:58
"Nothing's Gonna Stop Me Now" (Instrumental) - 3:58
"Dream City" - 4:55

Charts

Weekly charts

Year-end charts

Daniela Katzenberger version

Charts

References

1987 singles
1987 songs
Dance-pop songs
Jive Records singles
Number-one singles in Finland
Samantha Fox songs
Song recordings produced by Stock Aitken Waterman
Songs written by Matt Aitken
Songs written by Mike Stock (musician)
Songs written by Pete Waterman